The Société des Océanistes is a French scientific society, founded in 1936, that brings together specialists and interdisciplinary scholars of the cultures and societies of Oceania.  It was originally located at the Musée de l'Homme in Paris, but moved to the Musée du quai Branly in 2006. The president for 2013–2015 is Maurice Godelier.

The Society published a journal, the Journal de la Société des Océanistes, with the aid of the Centre national de la recherche scientifique (France) and the Centre national de littérature (Luxembourg).

See also 
 Polynesian Society

External links 
  Official site of the Société des océanistes

1936 establishments in France
Academia in France
Oceania studies